Adrian R'Mante is an American actor and acting coach best known for his role as Esteban Julio Ricardo Montoya de la Rosa Ramírez in the Disney Channel Original Series, The Suite Life of Zack & Cody.  He was born in Tampa, Florida, United States. He is married to Mayara Reina and they have two children.

R'Mante finished filming the thriller Underground that came out in autumn 2010, and he also made a return to The Suite Life on Deck in January 2010.

Filmography

External links
 

Living people
1978 births
Male actors from Tampa, Florida
Male actors from Florida
American male television actors